The 9th Battalion, CEF, an infantry battalion of the Canadian Expeditionary Force, was authorized on 10 August 1914.  It embarked for Britain on 1 October 1914, where it was redesignated as the 9th Reserve Infantry Battalion, CEF, on 29 April 1915, to provide reinforcements for the Canadian Corps in the field. The battalion was formally disbanded on 15 September 1917.

The battalion recruited in Edmonton, Alberta, and Ottawa, Ontario, and was mobilized at Camp Valcartier, Quebec.

The 9th Reserve Battalion formed part of the Canadian Training Depot at Tidworth Camp on the Salisbury Plain.

The 9th Battalion, CEF, had three officers commanding:
Lt.-Col. S.M. Rogers, 22 September 1914 – 4 May 1915
Lt.-Col. E.E.W Moore, 8 May 1915 – 25 April 1916
Lt.-Col. E.B. Clegg, 25 April 1916 – 2 January 1917

Perpetuations 
The perpetuation of the battalion was assigned in 1920 to the 2nd Battalion (Edmonton Fusiliers) (9th Battalion, CEF), the Edmonton Regiment. When the Edmonton Regiment was split into two regiments in 1924, the perpetuation passed to the 1st Battalion (9th Battalion, CEF), the Edmonton Fusiliers. The Edmonton Fusiliers are now incorporated by amalgamation in the South Alberta Light Horse, which continues to perpetuate the 9th Battalion, CEF.

Battle honour 
In 1929, the 9th Battalion was awarded the honour "The Great War, 1914–17".

See also 
 List of infantry battalions in the Canadian Expeditionary Force

References

External links
 canadiansoldiers.com article

009
Military units and formations of Alberta
Military units and formations of Ontario
Edmonton Fusiliers
19th Alberta Dragoons
South Alberta Light Horse